Deer Park Junior/Senior High School (DPHS) is a public high school located in Hamilton County, Ohio, United States, in the city of Deer Park. It is the only high school in the Deer Park Community City Schools district.

Deer Park High School serves students in seventh through twelfth grades from the neighborhood of Deer Park and portions of Sycamore Township and the village of Silverton. Classes in math, science, history, language arts, and foreign language are available, along with a variety of electives and weighted honors and advanced placement (AP) level courses.

Athletics
The school's athletic program competes as a member of the Ohio High School Athletic Association. The Wildcats are a member of the  Cincinnati Hills League.

OHSAA State Championships
 Boys Basketball – 2018
 Boys Baseball – 1977

Individual State Champions 
 Boys Cross Country – Andy Schramm - 1961

History
Deer Park was originally chartered in 1826, making it one of the oldest school districts in the Cincinnati area. In 1826, pioneer Daniel Schenk donated a plot of land directly across from the current Deer Park Jr./Sr. High School, where a one-room schoolhouse was erected. The school was originally called Amity which is now the name of the schools elementary. 

By the early 1900s the school house was starting to see age so the community passed a bond issue to build a new Amity school. The building was completed in 1907. 

Due to growth in the community, the building was expanded in 1926. A gym was also added and the name of the school was officially changed to the Deer Park Village School.

In 1952, due to continual community growth and the Baby boom after WWII, the district voted to construct two additional primary buildings as well as a new High School building. The current High School building was erected in 1952 and the two primary buildings were completed in 1958. They became known as Howard Elementary and Holmes Elementary. 

In 2015, renovations were completed to the High School building, which included the DP Career Academy which was designed to create opportunities for students to pursue careers outside of post-secondary education. 

In 2016, the district voted to combine the 3 primary school buildings into 1. Due to the long history of the Amity building, it was decided to modernize and reconstruct the existing structure. In 2018, the Amity Elementary was completed and is now home to all Kindergarten through 6th grade students in Deer Park.

Notable alumni
 Bill Cunningham (class of 1966): talk radio host on WLW and Premiere Radio Networks; former Assistant Attorney General of Ohio; current defense attorney
 Russ Nagelson, Former MLB player (Cleveland Indians, Detroit Tigers)

References

External links
School website
District Website

High schools in Hamilton County, Ohio
Public high schools in Ohio
Public middle schools in Ohio